Grott is a surname. Notable people with the surname include:

Bogumił Grott (born 1940), Polish historian
Matt Grott (born 1967), American baseball player

See also
Gott (surname)